Álex Forés Mendoza (born 12 April 2001) is a Spanish footballer who plays as a forward for Villarreal CF B.

Club career
Born in Valencia, Forés played for UE Vall dels Alcalans, Club Colegio Salgui EDE and Levante UD before joining Real Madrid's La Fábrica in July 2016. He left the latter side in 2018, and finished his formation with Villarreal CF.

Forés made his senior debut with the C-team on 1 September 2019, coming on as a second-half substitute for Juan Carlos Arana in a 1–0 Tercera División home win over CD Olímpic de Xàtiva, and scored his first goal on 11 November of the following year by netting the equalizer in a 2–2 home draw against CD Roda. He also appeared with the reserves in Segunda División B during the 2020–21 season, while scoring 13 times for the C's.

Definitely promoted to the B-side in August 2021, Forés was mainly used as a backup option to Arana, but still scored six times during the campaign as his side achieved promotion to Segunda División. He made his professional debut on 12 October, replacing Diego Collado in a 2–2 home draw against SD Ponferradina.

References

External links
Real Madrid profile 

2001 births
Living people
Spanish footballers
Footballers from Valencia (city)
Association football forwards
Segunda División players
Primera Federación players
Segunda División B players
Tercera División players
Villarreal CF C players
Villarreal CF B players